Nikola Lekić (born 28 August 1990) is a Serbian footballer, who plays for Smederevo. He plays as a forward for his team.

References

External links
 Nikola Lekić stats at utakmica.rs 
 
 

Living people
1990 births
Footballers from Belgrade
Serbian footballers
Serbian expatriate footballers
Serbian expatriate sportspeople in Romania
Expatriate footballers in Romania
FK Dorćol players
FC Dinamo București players
FK Teleoptik players
FK Smederevo players
FK Mladi Radnik players
FK Proleter Novi Sad players
FK Voždovac players
FK Sloboda Užice players
FK Bežanija players
Serbian First League players
Serbian SuperLiga players
Association football midfielders